Caprice, from the Italian capriccio, may refer to:

Art and entertainment 
 Caprice (1913 film), a film starring Mary Pickford
 Caprices (film), a 1942 French comedy film
 Caprice (1967 film), a film starring Richard Harris and Doris Day
 Caprice (1997 film), a film produced by Nicholas Tabarrok
 Caprice (2015 film), a 2015 French film directed by Emmanuel Mouret
 Capriccio (art) or caprice, in painting, an architectural fantasy
 A Caprice, a c. 1894 painting by Aubrey Beardsley
 Capriccio (music) or caprice, a piece of music usually free in form and of a lively character
 24 Caprices for Solo Violin (Paganini)
 Caprichos (The Caprices), a series of prints by Goya
 Caprice, a 1917 novel by Ronald Firbank
 Caprice, a 1929 adaptation by Philip Moeller of a play by Sil-Vara
 Caprice, a 1976 play by Charles Ludlam
 Caprice (band), a Moscow-based musical group
 , a Swedish record label operated by the state-owned Swedish Performing Arts Agency under the Ministry of Culture
 Caprice Records (US), a short-lived (1960–1963) American record label founded by Gerry Granahan
 "Caprice", a 1956 trumpet solo by James F. Burke

People 
 Caprice Benedetti (born 1965), American actress
 Caprice Bourret (born 1971), American model, actress and businesswoman
 Caprice Coleman (born 1977), American professional wrestler
 Caprice Crane (born 1970), American writer
 Caprice Dydasco (born 1993), American soccer player
 Alphonse "Big Boy" Caprice, fictional character from Dick Tracy
 Daniel Caprice (born 1989), British rugby player
 Frank Caprice (born 1962), Canadian hockey player
 Jake Caprice (born 1992), British footballer
 June Caprice (1895-1936), American actress
 Little Caprice (born 1988), Czech pornographic actress

Transportation 
 Caprice 15, a Canadian sailboat design
 Chevrolet Caprice, an American automobile manufactured from 1965 to 1996
 Holden Caprice, an Australian automobile produced by General Motors–Holden between 1990 and 2017
 Statesman (automobile) or Statesman Caprice, an Australian automobile produced by General Motors–Holden 1974–1985
 USS Caprice, several ships of the United States Navy
 Caprice (pilot boat), a 19th-century New York pilot boat

Restaurants 
 Caprice (restaurant), a French restaurant at the Hong Kong Four Seasons Hotel
 Café Caprice, restaurant in Cape Town, South Africa
 Le Caprice, restaurant in London, England

Place 

 Caprice, a suburb of Accra, Ghana

See also 
 Capriccio (disambiguation)
 Capricious (disambiguation)